Dizaj (also Romanized as Dīzaji; also known as Dīzaj Amīr, Dīzaj-e Amīr Madār, and Dizeh) is a village in Bavil Rural District, in the Central District of Osku County, East Azerbaijan Province, Iran. At the 2006 census, its population was 2,990, in 818 families.

References 

Populated places in Osku County